The Genesee Country Village and Museum is a 19th-century living history museum covering more than  located in the town of Wheatland, New York, United States, in the small hamlet of Mumford, about  from Rochester.  On the museum property is the 19th-century village (the Historic Village), the John L. Wehle Gallery of Sporting Art, the Genesee Country Nature Center, the Carriage Museum, the Silver Baseball Park and the Heirloom Gardens.  The facility offers special events and classes throughout the year.

Origin 
The Genesee Country Village and Museum was conceived and founded by John (Jack) L. Wehle in 1966. He was a collector of art and recognized that another art form, the work of regional carpenters, master builders, and housewrights, was fast disappearing from the landscape.  The proposed museum was to be a village of selected examples of 19th-century Genesee Country architecture that demonstrated not only form, but also function. The buildings would be showcases of the disciplines of cabinetry, weaving, pottery and other artisans which would be displayed in appropriate cultural context.

A site for this undertaking was chosen in Mumford, New York, a quiet corner of Monroe County.  Much of the land, once cleared and farmed, had reverted to the wild state which greeted the first settlers. Stone fences trailing through the rolling woodlands and anchoring the hedgerows remained as evidence of the frontier farming venture.

For ten years the founder and the museum director, architectural historian Stuart Bolger, guided a corps of carpenters and masons in turning the long-neglected land to new uses in the form of a recreated village. During the first decade of development, some three dozen buildings of the style, type, and function found in the rural communities of western New York were acquired and placed in the configuration of an early Genesee Country hamlet. Vintage farm structures were moved in and placed alongside the village. With care and historical respect these buildings were restored.

Concurrently, the curatorial staff undertook the quest for relevant artifacts to furnish and equip the renewed buildings.  The results of their quest are fully furnished houses, shops and farms supported by a large collection of antiques and historical pieces.

Historic Village 

The Historic Village is the core of the museum.  With the layout of a small 19th-century village, 68 restored and furnished buildings are available to walk through. A wide spectrum of buildings is presented, from the simple frontier cabin to an elaborate Victorian mansion, with professional, religious, and business buildings as well.  Most buildings are staffed by costumed interpreters, providing information about the history of the building, the time period, and in certain instances, demonstrating a craft or trade.

Demonstrations occurring throughout the village 
 19th-century games
 Quilting
 Weaving
 Fabric dyeing
 Wool spinning
 Cooking
 Broom making
 Farming
 Printing
 Blacksmithing
 Coopering
 Pottery throwing
 Woodworking
 Gunsmithing
 Tinsmithing

Silver Baseball Park 

The most recent addition to the museum's grounds is Silver Baseball Park.  Americans have enjoyed baseball for nearly 200 years.  The park was built to provide the historical background to this American pastime.  Silver Baseball Park is the first replica 19th-century baseball park in America, and began its operation on August 11, 2001. The park's name commemorates both Morrie Silver, the former owner, president, and general manager of the Rochester Red Wings; and the museum's twenty-fifth anniversary.

Currently, the museum has six ladies' and men's teams, dressed in period-style uniforms that face off each Saturday and Sunday, playing with period-appropriate equipment and by 1866 rules. Visitors can view the games from wooden bleachers that face an outfield fence sporting period-style advertising.  A manual scoreboard is operated by two young lads on scaffolding, while a press box tower is home to a tally keeper and announcer.  Concessions are available and include peanuts, birch beer and other period-appropriate food.

Heirloom Gardens 
Spread throughout the museum's grounds are thirteen heirloom gardens. Eye-catching blossoms, fragrant herbs, luscious fruits and rows upon rows of colorful vegetables are the components of these gardens.  Most of what is grown in the gardens is used regularly by village interpreters for preparing meals in the historic kitchens, dyeing fibers and making decorations or craft projects.  During the spring and summer months, both adults and children can learn more through various educational programs, tours and demonstrations that are specific to gardening.

The John L. Wehle Gallery of Sporting Art 

John Whele was an avid collector of sporting art.  His collection, displayed in the gallery, includes wildlife and sporting art that spans four centuries - from the 17th to the 20th.  Included are featured works by artists such as John James Audubon, Robert Bateman, Frederic Remington, Carl Rungius, Maud Earl, Bob Kuhn, Allan Houser and Bruno Liljefors.  A large sculpture garden is located outside the gallery amongst the trees.  The paintings and sculptures in this collection trace the social, artistic and ideological changes in the interaction between humans and animals.

The Carriage Museum 
A range of horse-drawn carriages from the 19th and early 20th centuries fills the Carriage Museum.  This unique collection presents a broad scope of two- and four-wheeled vehicles and sleighs. The collection includes  the basic horse-drawn conveyance that characterized the 19th-century rural scene, utility vehicles, sporting rigs, pleasure carts, and veteran vehicles from the harness track. One drawing much interest is the 12-horse hitch wagon from the Genesee Brewing Company, a local brewer that is still in business in the region.

Genesee Country Nature Center 
Visitors can view the native flora and fauna, and explore educational programs and exhibits at the Nature Center building. There are a number of trails in the area for hiking and cross-country skiing or snowshoeing.

Special events 

Special events are the highlight of the museum. They regularly occur throughout the year in both the Historic Village and Nature Center and are designed for all ages.  Numerous classes are also available for both children and adults throughout the museum.  A few offerings are listed below:

Historic Village events 
 Summer Sampler Children's Classes
 Adult Craft Classes
 Mother's and Father's Day events
 4th of July Celebration
 War of 1812 reenactment
 Civil War reenactment
 Scottish Highland Games
 Old Time Fiddlers Fair
 Agricultural Society Fair
 Halloween event
 Yuletide in the Country

Nature Center events 
 Children's Summer Earth Camp
 Birds of Prey event
 Maple Sugaring
 Trail Hikes
 Stargazing

References

External links 

 Genesee Country Village and Museum official site

Museums in Monroe County, New York
Living museums in New York (state)
Open-air museums in New York (state)
Nature centers in New York (state)
Carriage museums in the United States
Art museums established in 1976
Art museums and galleries in New York (state)
Transportation museums in New York (state)